Women in House of Representatives or House of Representatives women may refer to:

 Women in the Australian House of Representatives
 Women in the United States House of Representatives
 Women in the Sri Lanka House of Representatives; see Women in the Parliament of Sri Lanka
 Women in the House of Representatives of Jamaica

See also
 Women in Congress (disambiguation)
 Women in the House (disambiguation)
 Women in Parliament (disambiguation)
 Women in the Senate (disambiguation)
 Women in government
 Assemblywomen (play)